"Bubblin'" is the second and final single released from Cru's debut album, Da Dirty 30 (1997). It was not as successful as their previous single, only charting at number 23 on the Hot Rap Singles.

Track listing

A-Side
"Bubblin'" (Radio Edit)   
"Bubblin'"   
"Bubblin'" (Instrumental)

B-Side
"Live at the Tunnel" (Radio Edit)   
"Live at the Tunnel"

Charts

1997 singles
Music videos directed by Darren Grant
1997 songs
Def Jam Recordings singles